Linda Waimarie Nikora  is a New Zealand psychology academic. She is Māori, of Te Aitanga a Hauiti and Ngāi Tūhoe descent. She is currently Professor of Indigenous Studies and co-director of Ngā Pae o te Māramatanga at the University of Auckland, having moved in 2017 from the University of Waikato where she had been a Professor of Psychology and the founding Director of the Maori & Psychology Research Unit in the School of Psychology.

Nikora attended Hukarere Girls College in Napier, New Zealand before moving to the University of Waikato for both her undergraduate and PhD work. Her 2007 PhD thesis was entitled "Māori social identities in New Zealand and Hawai'i."

In 2018, Nikora was elected a Fellow of the Royal Society of New Zealand, while in 2021 she was awarded their Te Rangi Hiroa Medal.

Selected works 
 Lapsley, Hilary, Linda Waimarie Nikora, and Rosanne Marjory Black. " Kia Mauri Tau!" Narratives of recovery from disabling mental health problems. Mental Health Commission, 2002.
 Hodgetts, D., Drew, N., Sonn, C., Stolte, O., Nikora, L. W., & Curtis, C. (2010). Social psychology and everyday life. Palgrave Macmillan.
 Loto, R., Hodgetts, D., Chamberlain, K., Nikora, L. W., Karapu, R., & Barnett, A. (2006). Pasifika in the news: The portrayal of Pacific peoples in the New Zealand press. Journal of community & applied social psychology, 16(2), 100–118.
 Nikora, L. W., Karapu, R., Hickey, H., & Te Awekotuku, N. (2004). Disabled Māori and disability support options.
 Nikora, Linda Waimarie, Mohi Rua, and Ngahuia Te Awekotuku. "Wearing moko: Maori facial marking in today’s world." (2004): 191–203.
Ruru, Jacinta, and Linda Waimarie Nikora, eds. (2021). Ngā Kete Mātauranga: Māori scholars at the research interface. Otago University Press. ISBN 978-1-98-859255-8

References

External links
 Ngā Pae o te Māramatanga homepage

Living people
Year of birth missing (living people)
New Zealand women academics
Academic staff of the University of Waikato
University of Waikato alumni
Academic staff of the University of Auckland
New Zealand psychologists
New Zealand women psychologists
People educated at Hukarere Girls' College
Fellows of the Royal Society of New Zealand
New Zealand Māori women academics
Māori and Pacific Island scientists